The 2011–12 Brisbane Bandits season was the second season for the team. As was the case for the previous season, the Bandits will compete in the Australian Baseball League (ABL) with the other five foundation teams, and will again play its home games at the Brisbane Exhibition Ground.

Offseason 
In October 2011, Bandits manager David Nilsson stood down from his role, with Kevin Jordan named manager for the 2011–12 season.

Regular season

Standings

Record vs opponents

Game log 

|- bgcolor=#ffbbbb
| 1
| 4 November
| @ 
| L 6–0
| Mike McGuire (1–0)
| Simon Morriss (0–1)
| 
| 1,685
| 0–1
| 
|- bgcolor=#bbffbb
| 2
| 5 November (DH 1)
| @ 
| W 7–4
| Alex Maestri (1–0)
| Nathan Crawford (0–1)
| John Veitch (1)
| —
| 1–1
| 
|- bgcolor=#ffbbbb
| 3
| 5 November (DH 2)
| @ 
| L 5–4
| Steven Kent (1–0)
| Chris Mowday (0–1)
| 
| 1,224
| 1–2
| 
|- bgcolor=#bbffbb
| 4
| 6 November
| @ 
| W 9–6
| John Veitch (1–0)
| Brian Grening (0–1)
| Chris Mowday (1)
| 987
| 2–2
| 
|- bgcolor=#ffbbbb
| 5
| 10 November
| 
| L 6–4
| Craig Anderson (1–0)
| Simon Morriss (0–2)
| Koo Dae-Sung (2)
| 803
| 2–3
| 
|- bgcolor=#bbffbb
| 6
| 11 November
| 
| W 10–0 (F/7)
| Alex Maestri (2–0)
| Wayne Lundgren (0–1)
| 
| 1,030
| 3–3
| 
|- bgcolor=#bbffbb
| 7
| 12 November
| 
| W 2–0
| Yohei Yanagawa (1–0)
| Aiden Francis (0–1)
| Chris Mowday (2)
| 1,353
| 4–3
| 
|- bgcolor=#bbffbb
| 8
| 13 November
| 
| W 2–1
| Chris Mowday (1–1)
| Chris Oxspring (2–1)
| 
| 640
| 5–3
| 
|-
| 9
| 17 November
| @ 
| –
| 
| 
| 
| 
| 
| 
|-
| 10
| 18 November
| @ 
| –
| 
| 
| 
| 
| 
| 
|-
| 11
| 19 November
| @ 
| –
| 
| 
| 
| 
| 
| 
|-
| 12
| 20 November
| @ 
| –
| 
| 
| 
| 
| 
| 
|-

|-
|-
| 13
| 1 December
| @ 
| –
| 
| 
| 
| 
| 
| 
|-
| 14
| 2 December (DH 1)
| @ 
| –
| 
| 
| 
| 
| 
| 
|-
| 15
| 2 December (DH 2)
| @ 
| –
| 
| 
| 
| 
| 
| 
|-
| 16
| 3 December
| @ 
| –
| 
| 
| 
| 
| 
| 
|-
| 17
| 4 December
| @ 
| –
| 
| 
| 
| 
| 
| 
|-
| 18
| 8 December
| 
| –
| 
| 
| 
| 
| 
| 
|-
| 19
| 9 December
| 
| –
| 
| 
| 
| 
| 
| 
|-
| 20
| 10 December (DH 1)
| 
| –
| 
| 
| 
| 
| 
| 
|-
| 21
| 10 December (DH 2)
| 
| –
| 
| 
| 
| 
| 
| 
|-
| 22
| 15 December
| 
| –
| 
| 
| 
| 
| 
| 
|-
| 23
| 16 December
| 
| –
| 
| 
| 
| 
| 
| 
|-
| 24
| 17 December
| 
| –
| 
| 
| 
| 
| 
| 
|-
| 25
| 18 December
| 
| –
| 
| 
| 
| 
| 
| 
|-
| 26
| 29 December
| 
| –
| 
| 
| 
| 
| 
| 
|-
| 27
| 30 December
| 
| –
| 
| 
| 
| 
| 
| 
|-
| 28
| 31 December (DH 1)
| 
| –
| 
| 
| 
| 
| 
| 
|-
| 29
| 31 December (DH 2)
| 
| –
| 
| 
| 
| 
| 
| 
|-

|-
| 30
| 1 January
| 
| –
| 
| 
| 
| 
| 
| 
|-
| 31
| 4 January
| @ 
| –
| 
| 
| 
| 
| 
| 
|-
| 32
| 5 January
| @ 
| –
| 
| 
| 
| 
| 
| 
|-
| 33
| 6 January
| @ 
| –
| 
| 
| 
| 
| 
| 
|-
| 34
| 7 January
| @ 
| –
| 
| 
| 
| 
| 
| 
|-
| 35
| 8 January
| @ 
| –
| 
| 
| 
| 
| 
| 
|-
| 36
| 11 January
| 
| –
| 
| 
| 
| 
| 
| 
|-
| 37
| 12 January
| 
| –
| 
| 
| 
| 
| 
| 
|-
| 38
| 13 January
| 
| –
| 
| 
| 
| 
| 
| 
|-
| 39
| 14 January
| 
| –
| 
| 
| 
| 
| 
| 
|-
| 40
| 15 January
| 
| –
| 
| 
| 
| 
| 
| 
|-
| 41
| 19 January
| @ 
| –
| 
| 
| 
| 
| 
| 
|-
| 42
| 20 January
| @ 
| –
| 
| 
| 
| 
| 
| 
|-
| 43
| 21 January (DH 1)
| @ 
| –
| 
| 
| 
| 
| 
| 
|-
| 44
| 21 January (DH 2)
| @ 
| –
| 
| 
| 
| 
| 
| 
|-
| 45
| 22 January
| @ 
| –
| 
| 
| 
| 
| 
| 
|-

Roster

References 

Brisbane Bandits
Brisbane Bandits